Triplett & Scott was an American repeater carbine invented by Louis Triplett and William Scott of Columbia, Kentucky. It was issued to Kentucky Home Guard troops who were assigned to protect the supply lines of the Union Army under General Sherman's command.

See also

 Rifles in the American Civil War

References
 Westwood, David, Dr. (2005),  Rifles: an illustrated history of their impact, ABC-CLIO, 470 p., 

American Civil War rifles
Carbines
Lever-action rifles
Columbia, Kentucky